= List of provincial highways and roads in Koshi =

Koshi Province Government has classified provincial roads into three types:

1. Provincial Highways
2. Provincial Auxiliary Highways
3. Provincial Roads

In Section-2, Clause 3, Sub-clause 2 of the Provincial Public Road Act, 2077 (certified on August 9, 2020) enacted by the Government of Koshi Province, three categories of roads have been specified:

1. Provincial Highway: The width of the Provincial Highway shall be 12.5 meters (with a 3-meter setback) in the Terai region and 10 meters (with a 2-meter setback) in the Hilly region.
2. Provincial Auxiliary Highway: The width of the Provincial Auxiliary Highway shall be 10 meters (with a 2-meter setback) in the Terai region and 8 meters (with a 1.5-meter setback) in the Hilly region.
3. Provincial Road: The width of the Provincial Road shall be 8 meters (with a 1.5-meter setback) in the Terai region and 6 meters (with a 1.5-meter setback) in the Hilly region.

Furthermore, a notification published by the Ministry of Physical Infrastructure Development in the Koshi Provincial Gazette on October 25, 2024, specify 96 Auxiliary Highways and 289 Provincial Roads. There is no mention of Provincial Highway.

== Provincial Auxiliary Highway ==
There are 96 Auxiliary Highways in Koshi Province

List of Provincial Auxiliary Roads in Koshi Province
S.N.	Road Name	Starting Point	Destination	Length (km)
1	Bhadrapur-Ghodamara-Shantinagar Road	Ghodamara, Bhadrapur	Shantinagar	19.054
2	Garhigaun-Jirmale Road	Garhigaun	Jirmale	25.123
3	Fikkal-Pashupatinagar Road	Fikkal	Pashupatinagar Khalsa	10.76
4	Shukhanidigi Chowk-Rajghat Road	Shukhanidigi Chowk	Rajghat	16.094
5	Rajgadh-Laxmipur Road	Rajgadh	Laxmipur	16.621
6	Birtamod-Budhwari Road	Birtamod	Budhwari	12.786
7	Madanpur-Tinghare Road	Madanpur	Tinghare	27.391
8	Manaspur-Shukhani Road	Manaspur (NH01)	Shukhani	12.687
9	Shitali-Rajduwali Road	Shitali	Rajduwali	28.253
10	Kerawari-Kerkha Road	Kerawari	Kerkha	26.304
11	Kerkha-Bakuwa Road	Kerkha Bazar	Bakuwa	14.115
12	Larumwa-Nepaltar Road	Larumwa	Nepaltar	76.453
13	Bhedetar-Chisapani Road	Bhedetar	Chisapani	63.577
14	Daduwal-Pakhivas Road	Daduwal	Pakhivas	37.267
15	Keureni-Tamphulla Road	Keureni	Tamphulla	14.194
16	Pathari-Sikti Road	Pathari	Sikti (IB)	29.129
17	Bahande Bazar-Thangla Bhanjyang Road	Bahande Bazar	Thangla Bhanjyang	70.667
18	Altawari Simana-Padajungi Road	Altawari Simana	Padajungi	28.68
19	Nabalpurghat-Kuwapani Road	Nabalpurghat	Kuwapani	20.022
20	Kuwapani-Likhu Hydropower Road	Kuwapani	Likhu Hydropower	32.154
21	Jor Bauddha-Bakhore Road	Jor Bauddha	Bakhore	46.472
22	Wada-Salpa Bhanjyang Road	Wada	Salpa Bhanjyang	50.82
23	Kerawari Road (via Viratchowk)	Viratchowk	Kerawari	10.913
24	Simmale-Mudhe Road	Simmale	Mudhe	12.76
25	Telia-Jorpati Road	Telia	Jorpati	22.069
26	Sindhuwa-Leguwa Ghat Road	Sindhuwa	Leguwa Ghat	24.021
27	Aankhibhui-Dhode Road	Aankhibhui	Dhode	22.321
28	Chainpur-Khandbari Road	Chainpur	Khandbari	30.326
29	Hile-Boharat Tar Road	Hile	Boharat Tar	54.815
30	Rajnagi-Ranitar Road	Rajnagi	Ranitar	24.412
31	Airport-Diktel Bazar Road	Airport	Diktel	74.531
32	Dipu Toll-Dipu Toll Ring Road	Dipu Toll	Dipu Toll	42.234
33	Bhasme-Kunai Road	Bhasme	Kunai	55.792
34	Ladikatta-Aitawari Road	Ladikatta	Aitawari	26.875
35	Likhu-Dhuske Road	Likhu	Dhuske	72.252
36	Vanchore-Bhyaupokhari Road	Vanchore	Bhyaupokhari	15.175
37	Katle-Budhwari Road	Katle	Budhwari	32.104
38	Rangoli-Chisad Toll Road	Rangoli	Chisad Toll	22.26
39	Ravi-Ranke Bhanjyang Road	Ravi	Ranke Bhanjyang	22.822
40	Pathari-Rangeli Road	Pathari Refugee Camp	Rangeli	26.342
41	Shyamsila-Zero Point Road	Shyamsila Yalambar Chowk	Zero Point	12.149
42	Chiprid-Semle Road	Chiprid	Semle	10.643
43	Satisale-Gagane Road	Satisale	Gagane	68.817
44	Kanepokhari-Gadergaun Road	Kanepokhari	Gadergaun	36.746
45	Manglabare-Ramite Road	Manglabare	Ramite	23.599
46	Dewanganj-Devkota Chowk Road	Dewanganj	Devkota Chowk	16.029
47	Ramite-Dashami Road	Ramite	Dashami	21.426
48	Pikhuwakhola-Pangmakham Road	Pikhuwakhola	Pangmakham	37.817
49	Seti Vagar-Baghkhor Road	Seti Vagar	Baghkhor	27.924
50	India Border-Jhilphile Road	India Border	Jhilphile	21.09
51	Rajgadh-Armani Birtabazar Road	Rajgadh	Armani Birtabazar	15.431
52	Ranitar-Papmakham Road	Ranitar	Papmakham	108.206
53	Pathari-Shikharpur Road	Pathari	Shikharpur	15.769
54	Falamdunga-Temke Danda Road	Falamdunga	Temke Danda	63.985
55	Belwari-Letad Road	Belwari	Letad	12.303
56	Letad-Aruvote Road	Letad	Aruvote	17.652
57	Murkuchi-Chilaune Bhanjyang Road	Murkuchi	Chilaune Bhanjyang	23.747
58	Duhabi-Inaruwa Road	Duhabi	Inaruwa	15.097
59	Ikhuwa Khola-Bhandari Gaun Road	Ikhuwa Khola	Bhandari Gaun	39.242
60	Gadithumka-Barbote Road	Gadithumka	Barbote	42.466
61	Trishuli-Jitpur Danda Road	Trishuli	Jitpur Danda	19.144
62	Aamwari-Daregaunda Road	Aamwari	Daregaunda	58.045
63	Rasuwa Ghat-Bange Bazar Road	Rasuwa Ghat	Bange Bazar	64.866
64	Ranibash-Pakhivas Road	Ranibash	Pakhivas	37.952
65	Hangbupa Bhanjyang-Hile Road	Hangbupa Bhanjyang	Hile	36.605
66	Shikhar Kateri-Mudhe Road	Shikhar Kateri	Mudhe	21.731
67	Okharbote-Jirikhimti Road	Okharbote	Jirikhimti	50.142
68	Rambeni-Nundhaki Road	Rambeni	Nundhaki	30.169
69	Tharpu-Yamphudin Road	Tharpu	Yamphudin	8.651
70	Leguwa-Lakuwa Road	Leguwa	Lakuwa	199.092
71	Phorahat-Viratchowk Road	Phorahat	Viratchowk	17.536
72	Chawlar Kharka-Solududhkund Road	Chawlar Kharka	Solududhkund	26.412
73	Leti-Yarmkhu Road	Leti	Yarmkhu	56.835
74	Pyawuli-Bhyaupokhari Road	Pyawuli	Bhyaupokhari	14.297
75	Mudhe Bisani-Chailung Road	Mudhe Bisani	Chailung	20.579
76	Kerud Palle-Tumse Road	Kerud Palle	Tumse	43.208
77	Keroun-Chatara Road	Keroun	Chatara	51.979
78	Duhabi-Amardaha Road	Duhabi	Amardaha	34.219
79	Jayaramghat-Rabuwa Road	Jayaramghat	Rabuwa	27.205
80	Bhyaupokhari-Didla Bazar Road	Bhyaupokhari	Didla Bazar	11.51
81	Khyatud-Mafkhark Road	Khyatud	Mafkhark	19.253
82	Osangu Bazar-Hiledanda Road	Osangu Bazar	Hiledanda	26.395
83	Dandagau-Kartikay Road	Dandagau	Kartikay	31.234
84	Mohanpur-Fikaldanda Road	Mohanpur	Fikaldanda	23.389
85	Salbisawne-Fakchamara Road	Salbisawne	Fakchamara	14.631
86	Deurali-Telok Road	Deurali	Telok	30.4
87	Maunabudhuk-Gadhigaun Road	Maunabudhuk	Gadhigaun	15.786
88	Madibud-Ambote Road	Madibud	Ambote	21.025
89	Parpani-Chyangre Road	Parpani	Chyangre	13.558
90	Dhaplaighat Bazar-Chisapani Road	Dhaplaighat Bazar	Chisapani	36.155
91	Jarayotar-Pokhari Road	Jarayotar	Pokhari	16.606
92	Shivalaya Chowk-Gajurmukhi Dham Road	Shivalaya Chowk	Gajurmukhi Dham	17.271
93	Dipu Toll-Bagaha Chowk Road	Dipu Toll	Bagaha Chowk	20.676
94	Diyale-Vaitud Road	Diyale	Vaitud	19.096
95	Urlabari-Ramite Road	Urlabari	Ramite	21.789
96	Nayabazar-Pidarwani Road	Nayabazar	Pidarwani	11.302

== Provincial Road ==
There are 289 Provincial Roads in Koshi Province.

List of Provincial Roads in Koshi Province
S.N.	Road Name	Starting Point	Destination	Length (km)
1	Lambughat-Yasok Bazar	Lambughat	Yasok Bazar	15.093
2	Budhware-Hansmara	Budhware	Hansamara	28.591
3	Phungling-Pathibhara	Phungling	Pathibhara	22.356
4	Kanchhidokan-Shivdobhan	Kanchidokan	Shivdobhan	25.635
5	Pingdanda-Yangchungtar	Pingdanda	Yangchungtar	22.455
6	Yasos Bazar – Sidingwa	Yasos Bazar	Sidingwa	15.685
7	Chainpur – Kuwapani	Chainpur	Kuwapani	62.376
8	Majhakharka – Milan Chok	Majhakharka	Milan Chok	55.222
9	Danuwarbesi – Gudrumdaha	Danuwarbesi	Gudrumdaha	13.411
10	Lhapra – Chaurikharka	Lhapra	Chaurikharka	52.452
11	Salleri – Sombare	Salleri	Sombare	23.656
12	Sombare Bazar – Kangel	Sombare Bazar	Kangel	35.375
13	Jitpur Bazar – Ilam	Jitpur Bazar	Ilam	21.432
14	Lamagaun – Pokhare	Lamagaun	Pokhare	34.564
15	Thadhe – Ramche	Thadhe	Ramche	16.632
16	Shirchaur – Khijiphlate	Shirchaur	Khijiphlate	34.94
17	Pakhribas – Mahalaxmi	Pakhribas	Mahalaxmi	18.556
18	Phalate – Siddhicharan	Phalate	Siddhicharan	33.957
19	Phungling – Banjhogra	Phungling	Banjhogra	2.742
20	Karkigaun – Papung	Karkigaun	Papung	48.789
21	Salleri – thumkigaun	Salleri	thumkigaun	18.346
22	Dovan – Khurukla	Dovan	Khurukla	19.085
23	Katahare – Hatdanda	Katahare	Hatdanda	25.854
24	Bijule – Rabuwa	Bijule	Rabuwa	19.32
25	Khahare – Thechambu	Khahare	Thechambu	7.945
26	Dovan – Guphapokhari	Dovan	Gufapokhari	27.693
27	Yasok-Khalde - Angna-Mauwa	Yasok Bazar	Jorsale	16.351
28	Okhale - Nunthala-Rupatar	Okhale	Simale	14.2
29	Makarjung-Jil-Lalikharka-Arthatar-Chabise border	Baudhadham	Chhabise Border	10.965
30	Gumbapath-Arubote - Jogmai khola-Namsaling Ilam	Phikkal Bazar	Tilkeni Mod	29.204
31	Maibeni-Hattisar-Shukrabare-Gupti-Sankhawung-Shanishchare-Mihelbote -Tinkhute (Hattisar-Gupti)	Hattisar	Gupti	11.605
32	Maibeni-Hattisar-Shukrabare-Gupti-Sankhawung-Shanishchare-Mihelbote -Tinkhute (Lapsibote-Thulo Bamjin)	Lapsibote	Thulo Bamjin	15.733
33	Dopkile - Dandakharka-Piple-Myanglung	Dopkile	Myanglung	11.068
34	marchabun-Tindovane -Dali Bihibare	Marchhebun	Maguna	12.53
35	Daburad-Baikunthe - Moriya	Daburang	Mariya	27.165
36	Biblyate - Arubote - Malbase -Rulukbesi-Pingdanda	Chureghanti	Rulukbesi	10.015
37	Matikhuwa-Baniyatol-Amtola	Matikhuwa	Amtola	12.407
38	Labarbote -Budhimorang-Phaksib-Danda Bazar	Labarbote	Danda Bazar	21.174
39	Rajarani-Maunabudhuk-bodhe -Yeliya	Rajarani Tal	Teliya	14.86
40	Danabari Debrebas - Bhirgaun-Hile	Danabari Debrebas	Hile	19.368
41	Marse - Mangalbare-Charghare-Lasune Bazar	Marse	Lasune Bazar	24.587
42	Leguwaghat-Marek-Telung Ghumaune -Dachhe Danda-Basantpur	Leguwaghat	Laliguras	24.587
43	Thalthale -Khoku	Thalthale	Khoku	15.762
44	lukhuwa-Batase -Shukrabare Bazar	lukhuwa	Shukrabare	18.385
45	Daburang bhanjyang-Bhanjyangkharka-chisapani	Daburang	Kahule	11.995
46	Sankranti Bazar-Hwaku-Bijure-Limbuni-Nighuradin-juketar-Hangpang-Pavek-Phyatu-Sanghu	Sankranti Bazar	Sanghu	84.865
47	Salung-Thoklung - Chuhandanda	Salung	Chuhandanda	19.03
48	Postal route - Shiv Mandir - Manganbare Daulatpur Hardibari Road (Shiv Mandir- Hardibari)	Shiv Mandir	Hardibari	10.142
49	Guthitar - Baghkhor - Chhidi	Guthitar	Chhidi	11.999
50	Tritiya-Thangpa-Khalangtar-Magarcheppa-Dandagaun-Paisubhanjyang-Papuden-Machhebung-Thoklimba-Phalelung RM. Road (Tritiya Bazaar - Sakarkhande)	Tritiya Bazaar	Sakarkhande	28.665
51	Bhojpur - Suntale - Tintale - Dingla-Satighat-Bohratar Road (Kafle - Bohratar)	Kafle	Bohratar	51.916
52	Ravi-Fuyatap-Aamchowk-Kolbote-Ekatappa-Mangalbare	Ravi Bazar	Mangalbare	41.509
53	Bansilaghat-Rangbhange-Tavua-Diplung	Bansilaghat	Diplung	21.844
54	Khudunabari-Budhi Sukhangaun-Kharwani-Batase - Bhalukhop Road (Budhi Sukhangaun-Bhalukhop	Budhi Sukhangaun	Bhalukhop	25.286
55	Shantidanda-Pachish - Ilam	Shantidanda	Ilam	17.69
56	Rajgadh-Bardashi-Lakshmipur-Arjundhara-Madanpur-Khudunabari-Sukhuna Road (Lakshmipur-Sukhani)	Lakshmipur	Sukhani	28.128
57	Himali Chowk-Baniyani Bazaar-Adhikari Chowk-Mangalbare Road (Himali Chowk-Mangalbare)	Himali Chowk	Mangalbare	24.183
58	Hawaldarchok-Shivganj-Naharchok-dudhe Bazar Road (Hawaldarchok-dudhe Bazar)	Hawaldarchok	Dudhe Bazar	
59	Gauriganj-Damuna Bazaar-Kohbara-Tanguwa-Bhaluvathan Shanishchare-Gauradaha Road			
60	Aitabare-Suntale-Parle-Asalebesi-Maibeni Road (Parle-Maibeni)	Parle	Maibeni	
61	Mudhe-Mangalbare Road (Mudhe-Mangalbare)	Mudhe	Mangalbare	
62	Basantpur -Devithan-Mangalbare (Basantapur-Mangalbare)	Basantpur	Mangalbare	
63	Khorsanechok-Kerabari-Aitabare-Kalimati-Singhdebi Road	Khorsanechok	Sombare Bhanjyang	
64	Khorsanechok-Kerabari-Aitabare-Kalimati-Singhdebi Road	Sombare Bhanjyang	sing baby	
65				
66				
67				
68				
69				
70				
71				
72				
73				
74				
75				
76				
77				
78				
79				
80				
81				
82				
83				
84				
85				
86				
87				
88				
89				
90				
91				
92				
93				
94				
95				
96				
97				
98				
99				
100				
